This is a list of writers from Morocco.

Twentieth century


A

 Eliette Abécassis (born 1969)
 Leila Abouzeid (born 1950)
 Mohammed Achaari (born 1951)
 Said Achtouk (died 1989)
 Issa Aït Belize
 Lotfi Akalay (1943–2019)
 Mohammed Akoujan
 Mehdi Akhrif (born 1952)
 Mohammed ibn Mohammed Alami (1932–1993)
 Idriss ibn al-Hassan al-Alami (1925–2007)
 Ahmad al-Tayyeb Aldj (1928–2012)
 Tewfik Allal (born 1947)
 Farid al-Ansari (1960–2009)
 Najib El Aoufi (born 1948)
 Robert Assaraf (1936–2018)
 Nabil Ayouch (born 1969)
 Ali Azaykou (1942–2004)

B 

 
 Souad Bahéchar (born 1953)
 Latifa Baka (born 1964)
 Ahmed Barakat (1960–1994)
 Muriel Barbery (born 1969)
 Laarbi Batma (1948–1998)
 Hafsa Bekri-Lamrani
 Abdelmalek Belghiti (1906–2010)
 Abdeslam Benabdelali
 Abdelkader Benali (born 1975)
 Mehdi Ben Barka (1920–1965)
 Zoubeir Ben Bouchta
 Halima Ben Haddou (born 1954)
 Tahar Ben Jelloun (born 1944)
 Siham Benchekroun
 Ahmed Benchemsi
 Rajae Benchemsi (born 1957)
 Esther Bendahan (born 1964)
 Abdelmajid Benjelloun (1919–1981)
 Abdelmajid Benjelloun (born 1944)
 Abdelwahab Benmansour (1920–13 November 2008)
 Abdelouahid Bennani (born 1958)<ref>"Le roman de A.Bennani" in: La Dépeche de Tanger 9-2-2008, "Regards dur la Poésie de A. Bennani, in Al Bayane, 8-12-2006.</ref>
 Mohammed Suerte Bennani (born 1961)
 Mohammed Bennis (born 1948)
 Khnata Bennouna (born 1940)
 Mohammed Benzakour (born 1972)
 Mohammed Berrada (born 1938)
 Hafsa Bikri (born 1948)
 Mahi Binebine (born 1959)
 Mohammed Ibrahim Bouallou (born 1934)
 Ali Bourequat
 Hassan Bourkia (born 1956)
 Ahmed Bouzfour (born 1954)
 Al-Yazid al-Buzidi Bujrafi (1925–2011)

C

 Mohamed Chafik (born 1926)
 Nadia Chafik (born 1962)
 Abdelkader Chaoui (born 1950)
 Driss Ben Hamed Charhadi (1937–1986)
 Abdelkader Chatt (1904–1992)
 Mohamed Choukri (1935–2003)
 Driss Chraïbi (1926–2007)

D

 Mohammed Daoud (1901–1984)
 Zakya Daoud (born 1937)
 Mohammed Ben Abdelaziz Debbarh (1928–2008)
 Farida Diouri (1953–2004)

E

 Youssouf Amine Elalamy (born 1961)
 Mahdi Elmandjra (1933–2014)

F

 Youssef Fadel (born 1949)
 Allal al-Fassi (1910–1974)
 Malika al-Fassi (1920–2007)
 Halima Ferhat (born 1941)
 Mohammed al-Habib al-Fourkani (1922–2008)

G

 Abdelkrim Ghallab (1919–2006)
 Abd al-Aziz al-Ghumari (1920–1997)
 Abdullah al-Ghumari (1910–1993)
 Ahmad al-Ghumari (1902–1961)
 Abdallah Guennoun (1910–1989)
 Soumya Naâmane Guessous

H

 Mohammed Aziz El-Hababi (1922–1993)
 Mouna Hachim (born 1967)
 Najat El Hachmi (born 1979)
 Ali Haddani (1936–2007)
 Badia Hadj Nasser (born 1938)Najib Redouane, "La Voile Mise à Nue", in: International journal of Francophone studies, 1997, pp. 132–194.
 Allal El Hajjam (born 1948)
 Mohammed Hajuji (died 1952) 
 Mohammed El Haloui (1923–2004)
 Mohammed al-Harradi
 Ahmed Harrak Srifi (died 1925)
 Mohammed ibn al-Hasan al-Hajwi (died 1956)
 Ben Salem Himmich (born 1947)
 Emmanuel Hocquard (1940–2019)
 Ali Squalli Houssaini (1932–2018)

J

 Mohammed Abed al-Jabri (1936–2010)
 Salim Jay (born 1951)
 Abbas al-Jirari (born 1937)
 Abderrafi Jouahri (born 1943)
 Abdelkarim Jouiti (born 1962)
 Ahmed Joumari (1939–1995)

K

 Maati Kabbal (born 1954)
 Mohammed Kaghat (1942–2001)
 Mohammed Khaïr-Eddine (1941–1995)
 Mohammed Khammar Kanouni (1938–1991)
 Abdelkebir Khatibi (1938–2009)
 Rita El Khayat (born 1944)
 Driss El Khouri (1939–2022)
 Abdelfattah Kilito (born 1945)
 Driss Ksikes (born 1968)

L

 Abdellatif Laabi (born 1942)
 Abdelrahim Lahbibi (born 1950)
 Mohammed Aziz Lahbabi (1922–1993)
 Amina Lahbabi-Peters
 Leila Lahlou
 Laila Lalami (born 1968)
 Wafaa Lamrani (born 1960)
 Abdallah Laroui (born 1933)
 Fouad Laroui (born 1958)
 Mohammed Leftah (1946–2008)
 Ahmed Lemsih (born 1950)
 Ali Lmrabet (born 1959)

M

 Mustafa Maadawi (1937–1961)
 Ahmed al-Madini (born 1949)
 Edmond Amran El Maleh (1917–2010)
 Zahra Mansouri
 Ahmed Mejjati (1936–1995)
 Driss El Meliani
 Saida Menebhi (1952–1977)
 Fatima Mernissi (1940–2015)
 Abderrahmane El Moudden
 Omar Mounir
 Khireddine Mourad (born 1950)
 Malika Moustadraf (1969–2006)
 Mohammed El-Moustaoui (born 1943)
 Mouad Moutaoukil (born 1997)
 Mohamed Mrabet (born 1936)

N

 Mririda n'Ait Attik (c. 1900–c. 1930)
 Mohammed al-Makki al-Nasiri (1906–1994)

 Mohamed Nedali (born 1962)
 Mostafa Nissaboury (born 1943)

O

 Rachid O (born 1970)
 Salah El-Ouadie (born 1952)
 Mohammed Hassan El Ouazzani (1910–1978)
 Malika Oufkir (born 1953)
 Touria Oulehri

Q

 Bachir Qamari (1951–2021)

R

 Mubarak Rabi (born 1938)
 Mohamed Said Raihani (born 1968)
 Fouzia Rhissassi
 Najima Rhozali (born 1960)

S

 Mohammed Sabbag (born 1930)
 Mohammed Sabila
 Abdeldjabbar Sahimi (born 1938)
 Abdelhadi Said (born 1974)
 Amale Samie (1954–2018)
 Thouria Saqqat (1935–1992)
 Tayeb Seddiki (1938–2016)
 Ahmed Sefrioui (1915–2004)
 Mohamed Serghini (born 1930)
 Abdelhak Serhane (born 1950)
 Mohamed Sibari (1945–2013)
 Hourya Sinaceur
 Mohammed Allal Sinaceur (born 1941)
 Ali Siqli (born 1932)
 Faouzi Skali (born 1953)
 Mohammed al-Mokhtar Soussi (1900–1963)

T

 Abdelkarim Tabbal (born 1931)
 Hicham Tahir (born 1989)
 Abdellah Taïa (born 1973)
 Boutaina Tawil
 Abdelhadi Tazi (1921–2015)
 Mohammed Azeddine Tazi (born 1948)
 Mahjoub Tobji (born 1942)
 Abdelkhalek Torres (1910–1970)
 Ahmed Toufiq (born 1943)
 Houcine Toulali (1924–1998)
 Bahaa Trabelsi (born 1968)

U

W
 Tuhami al-Wazzani (1903–1972)

Y

 Said Yaktine (born 1955)
 Yasser Harrak (born 1976) writer, commentator and founder of the Middle East Seminar forum.
 Nadia Yassine (born 1958)

Z

 Haim Zafrani (1922–2004)
 Mohamed Zafzaf (1942–2001)
 Mohammed Zniber (1923–1993)
 Abdallah Zrika (born 1953)

Nineteenth century

 Mohammed ibn Abu al-Qasim al-Sijilmasi (died 1800)
 Mohammed ibn Abd as-Salam ibn Nasir (died 1824)
 Mohammed Ibn Amr (died 1827)
 Ali Barrada al-Fasi Harazim (died 1856)
 Thami Mdaghri (died 1856)
 Idriss al-Amraoui (died 1879)
 Mohammed Gannun (died 1885)
 Abu Hassan Ali Mahmud al-Susi al-Simlali (died 1894)
 Ahmad ibn Hamdun ibn al-Hajj (died 1898)
 Mohammed al-Tahir al-Fasi (1830–1868)
 Abd as-Salam al-Alami (1834–1895)
 Ahmad ibn Khalid al-Nasiri (1835–1897)
 Salomon Berdugo (1854–1906)
 Muhammad ibn al-Qasim al-Badisi (d. 1922)
 Mohammed ibn Jaafar al-Kattani (1858–1927)
 Mohammed Slimani (1863–1926)
 Ibn Zaydan (1873–1946)
 Mohammed Skirej (1875–1965)
 Muhammad Ibn al-Habib (1876–1972)
 Ahmed Skirej (1878–1944)
 Abdelkrim al-Khattabi (1882–1963)
 Mohammed Boujendar (1889–1926)
 Abd Allah al-Muwaqqit al-Marrakushi (1894–1949)
 Mohammed Ben Brahim (1897–1955)

Eighteenth century

 Mohammed ibn abd al-Wahab al-Ghassani (died 1707)
 Mohammed ibn Qasim ibn Zakur (died 1708)
 Mohammed ibn al-Tayyib al-Alami (died 1722)
 Hasan ibn Rahlal al-Madani (died 1728)
 Abd al-Qadir ibn Shaqrun (died after 1727/8)
 Mohammed ibn Zakri al-Fasi (died 1731)
 Ahmed ibn al-Mubarak al-Lamti al-Sijilmasi (died 1741)
 Khnata bent Bakkar (died 1754)
 Ibn al-Wannan (died 1773)
 Ahmed al-Ghazzal (died 1777)
 Abd Allah ibn Azzuz (died 1789)
 Mohammed ibn Uthman al-Miknasi (died 1799)
 Mohammed al-Qadiri (1712–1773)
 David Hassine (1722–1792)
 Abu al-Qasim al-Zayyani (1734–1833)
 Kaddour El Alamy (1742–1850)
 Mohammed al-Ruhuni (1746–1815)
 Raphael Berdugo (1747–1821)
 Sulayman al-Hawwat (1747–1816)
 Ahmad ibn Ajiba (1747–1809)
 Mohammed al-Duayf (born 1752)
 Mohammed al-Tayyib ibn Kiran (1758–1812)
 Muhammad al-Arabi al-Darqawi (1760–1823)
 Hamdun ibn al-Hajj al-Fasi (1760–1817)
 Ahmad ibn Idris al-Fasi (1760–1837)
 Suleiman al-Alawi (1760–1822)
 Mohammed al-Harraq (1772–1845)
 Mohammed al-Haik (fl. 1790)
 Mohammed al-Tawdi ibn Suda (1790–1794/5)
 Ahmed al-Salawi (1791–1840)
 Mohammed ibn Idris al-Amrawi (1794–1847)
 Mohammed Akensus (1797–1877)
 Hemmou Talb (18th century)

Seventeenth century

 Isaac Uziel (died 1622)
 Abd al-Rahman al-Tamanarti (died 1650)
 Abu Abdallah Mohammed al-Murabit al-Dila'i (died 1678)
 Mohammed ibn Nasir (1603–1674)
 Mohammed al-Mahdi al-Fasi (1624–1698)
 Mohammed al-Rudani (c. 1627–1683)
 Abu Salim al-Ayyashi (1628–1679)
 Abd al-Rahman al-Fasi (1631–1685)
 Abu Ali al-Hassan al-Yusi (1631–1691)
 Ahmed al-Hashtuki  (1647–1715)
 Ahmed ibn Nasir (1647–1717)
 Abd as-Salam al-Qadiri (1648–1698)
 Abd al-Wahhab Adarrak (1666–1746)
 Mohammed Awzal (1670–1749)
 Mohammed al-Ifrani (1670–1745)
 Ahmed ibn al-Mubarak al-Lamati (1679–1743)
 Ali Misbah al-Zarwili (1685–1737)
 Mohammed ibn al-Tayyib (1698–1756)

Sixteenth century

 Mohammed ibn Yajbash al-Tazi (died 1505, AH 920)
 Ali ibn Qasim al-Zaqqaq (died 1506)
 Abdallah al-Ghazwani (died 1529)
 Abderrahman El Majdoub (died 1569)
 Mahammad ibn Isa al-Sanhadji (died c. 1578) 
 Abu-l-Hasan al-Tamgruti (died 1594/5)
 Ahmed al-Mandjur (1520–1587)
 Abu Abdallah ibn Askar (1529–1578)
 Abul Qasim ibn Mohammed al-Ghassani (1548–1610)
 Abd al-Aziz al-Fishtali (1549–1621)
 Ahmad Ibn al-Qadi (1553–1616)
 Ahmed ibn Abi Mahalli (1559–1613)
 Abraham Azulai (c. 1570 – 1643)
 Mohammed al-Arbi al-Fasi (1580–1642)
 Abdelaziz al-Maghrawi (c. 1580 – 1600)
 Abd al-Wahid ibn Ashir (1582–1631)
 Ahmed Mohammed al-Maqqari (c. 1591 – 1632)
 Mahamad Mayyara (1591–1662)
 Abd al-Qadir al-Fasi (1599–1680)
 Al-Masfiwi (16th century)

Fifteenth century

 Abdarrahman al-Makudi (died 1405)
 Ali ibn Haydur at-Tadili (died 1413)
 Ibrahim al-Tazi (died CE 1462/AH 866)
 Muhammad al-Jazuli (died 1465)
 Ibrahim ibn Hilal al-Sijilmasi (died c. 1498)
 Ibn Ghazi al-Miknasi (1437–1513)
 Ahmad Zarruq (1442–1493)
 Leo Africanus (1488–1554)

Fourteenth century

 Abu Mohammed al-Qasim al-Sijilmasi (died 1304)
 Ibn Abi Zar (died c. 1315)
 Abu al-Hassan Ali ibn Mohammed al-Zarwili (died 1319)
 Abd al-Haqq al-Badisi (died after 1322)
 Ibn Shuayb (died 1349)
 Ahmad ibn Ashir al-Ansari (died 1362)
 Ibn Idhari (beginning of the 14th century)
 Ibn Battuta (1304–1377)
 Mohammed al-Hazmiri (fl. 1320)
 Ibn Juzayy (1321–1357)
 Abu Muqri Mohammed al-Battiwi (fl. 1331)
 Ibn Abbad al-Rundi (1333–1390)
 Abu Yahya ibn al-Sakkak (1335–1415)
 Abd al-Rahman al-Jadiri (1375–1416)
 Ismail ibn al-Ahmar (1387–1406)
 Abu al-Hasan Ali al-Jaznai (14th century)

Thirteenth century

 Ibn al-Yasamin (died 1204)
 Abu Musa al-Jazuli (died 1209)
 Ahmad ibn Munim al-Abdari (died 1228)
 Ibn al-Zayyat al-Tadili (died 1229/30)
 Abd al-Rahman al-Fazazi (died 1230)
 Ali ibn al-Qattan (died 1231)
 Ibn al-Khabbaza (died 1239)
 Abdelaziz al-Malzuzi (died 1298)
 Salih ben Sharif al-Rundi (1204–1285)
 Malik ibn al-Murahhal (1207–1289)
 Abu al-Qasim Qasim ibn al-Shatt (1245–1323)
 Ibn abd al-Malik al-Marrakushi (1237–1303)
 Mohammed ibn Hajj al-Abdari al-Fasi (c. 1256 – 1336)
 Ibn al-Banna al-Marrakushi (1256–1321)
 Mohammed ibn Rushayd (1259–1321)
 Abu al-Qasim al-Tujibi (1267/8–1329)
 Mohammed ibn Adjurrum (1273–1323)
 Abu al-Qasim al-Sharif al-Sabti (1297–1359 AH 697–760)
 Abu Ali al-Hasan al-Marrakushi (fl. 1281/2)
 Mohammed al-Abdari al-Hihi (fl. c. 1289)
 Judah ben Nissim (13th century)

Twelfth century

 Ibn Bajjah (died 1138)
 Abu Jafar ibn Atiyya (died 1158)
 Ali ibn Harzihim (died 1163)
 Al-Suhayli (1114–1185)
 Zechariah Aghmati (1120–1195)
 Abu al-Abbas as-Sabti (1129–1204)
 Abu al-Abbas al-Jarawi (1133–1212)
 Abd as-Salam ibn Mashish (1140–1227)
 Mohammed ibn Qasim al-Tamimi (1140/5)
 Ibn Dihya al-Kalby (1149–1235)
 Mohammed al-Baydhaq (c. 1150)
 Abu Mohammed Salih (1153–1234)
 Joseph ben Judah of Ceuta (c. 1160–1226)
 Abu al-Abbas al-Azafi (1162–1236)
 Abdelwahid al-Marrakushi (born 1185)
 Abu-l-Hassan ash-Shadhili (1196–1258)
 Abu Bakr al-Hassar (12th century)

Eleventh century

 Abu Imran al-Fasi (died 1038)
 Isaac Alfasi (1013–1103)
 Mohammed ibn Tumart (c. 1080 – 1130)
 Qadi Ayyad ben Moussa (1083–1149)
 Mohammed al-Idrisi (1099–1165)

Tenth century

 Dunash ben Labrat (920–990)
 Judah ben David Hayyuj (945–1000)
 David ben Abraham al-Fasi (c. 950 – 1000)

Ninth century
 Idriss II (791–828)

See also

 List of Moroccan women writers
 African Writers Series
 Lists of authors
 List of African writers by country

Bibliography
 Julie Scott Meisami and Paul Starkey (ed), Encyclopedia of Arabic Literature, London: Routledge, 1998 (Entry "Maghrib", p. 484)
 Encyclopedia of African Literature, ed Simon Gikandi, London: Routledge, 2003.
 The Cambridge History of African and Caribbean Literature, ed Abiola Irele and Simon Gikandi, 2 vls, Cambridge [u.a.]: Cambridge University Press, 2004.
 Encyclopaedia of Islam, edited by P.J. Bearman, Th. Bianquis, C.E. Bosworth, E. van Donzel and W.P. Heinrichs, Brill Publishers 2003
 Roger Allen and D.S. Richards (ed.), Arabic Literature in the Post-classical Period, Cambridge University Press, 2006 
 Jacques Berque, "La Littérature Marocaine Et L'Orient Au XVIIe Siècle", in: Arabica, Volume 2, Number 3, 1955, pp. 295–312
 Gannun, Abd Allah, El genio marroquí en la literatura árabe / Abdal-lah Guennún al Hasani ; traducido directamente del árabe y anotado por Jerónimo Carrillo Ordóñez y Mohammad Tayeddin Buzid, Publisher:	[Tetuán] : Alta Comisaría de España en Marruecos, Delegación de Asuntos Indígenas, Centro de Estudios Marroquíes, 1939 (Artes Gráficas Boscá)
 Mohammed Lakhdar, La vie littéraire au Maroc sous la dynastie 'Alawide, Rabat, 1971
 Najala al-Marini, Al-Sh'ar al-Maghribi fi 'asr al-Mansur al-Sa'di, Rabat: Nashurat Kuliat al-Adab wa al-Alum al-Insania, 1999 (Analysis of the work of the main poets of the age of Ahmed al-Mansour)
 Monroe, J. T., Hispano-Arabic Poetry During the Almoravid Period: Theory and Practice, Viator 4, 1973, pp. 65–98
 Nasser S. Al-Samaany, Travel Literature of Moroccan Pilgrims during the 11-12th/17-18th Centuries: thematic and artistic study, PhD. thesis, University of Leeds, 2000
 Hasan al-Wazzani ed., Dalîl al-kuttâb al-magâriba. A' d:â´ Ittih:âd Kuttâb al-Magrib, Rabat: Manshűrât Ittih:âd Kuttâb al-Magrib, 1993
 Hasan al-Wazzani, Al-adab al-magribî al-h:adîth, 1929–1999, Casablanca: Dâr al-Thaqâfa, 2002
 Otto Zwartjes, Ed de Moor, e.a. (ed.) Poetry, Politics and Polemics: Cultural Transfer Between the Iberian Peninsula and North Africa'', Rodopi, 1996,

References

External links
 Literatura Marroqui Contemporanea (lexicon of author-biographies in Spanish)
 Index of The Cambridge History of African and Caribbean Literature, ed Abiola Irele and Simon Gikandi, 2 vls, Cambridge: Cambridge University Press, 2004
 Poetry International Web, Morocco
 Abdellatif Akbib, Abdelmalek Essaadi, Birth and Development of the Moroccan Short Story  University, Morocco
 Suellen Diaconoff,  Professor of French, Colby College: Women writers of Morocco writing in French, 2005 (Survey)
 Maghreb Arts, Some Key Figures of Moroccan, Algerian and Tunisian literature 
 Bibliography of sources on Moroccan literature in all languages 
 In Spanish: Enciclopedia GER, P. Martsnez Montávez, "Marruecos (magrib Al-agsá) VI. Lengua y Literatura."

 
 
Writers
Moroccan literature
Moroccan
Moroccan